Glidden is an unincorporated community and census-designated place in Colorado County, Texas, United States. As of the 2010 census it had a population of 661.

History 
Located along the main line of the Southern Pacific Railroad, the town site was originally established by the Galveston, Harrisburg and San Antonio Railway in 1885. The post office was opened three years later, and the town served as a major railroad maintenance facility stop between Houston and El Paso. The community flourished during the Spanish–American War and the two world wars. Shortly after, the railroad movement from steam engines to those operating with diesel and electric rendered most of the railroad maintenance shops in Glidden obsolete. This caused the population to decrease to 150 residents by the late 1940s.

Between January 1911 and April 1912, a series of ax murders occurred in Texas and Louisiana, claiming 49 victims. Glidden was one of the numerous towns in which this type of homicide took place. It is believed that all victims died at the hands of an unidentified killer (or killers) during the reign of terror. In Glidden, a woman with her four children and a male guest were all murdered in their sleep in March 1912. There were several individuals suspected in the crimes in the different locations, but charges were dropped against all of them for lack of evidence. The murder cases remain unsolved.

Geography
Glidden is located in north-central Colorado County and is bordered to the east by the city of Columbus, the county seat. U.S. Route 90 passes through the community, and Interstate 10 passes along the southern edge, with access from Exit 693.

References

External links 
 

Unincorporated communities in Colorado County, Texas
Unincorporated communities in Texas
Census-designated places in Colorado County, Texas
Census-designated places in Texas